Akesan is a small town located in Alimosho local government area of Lagos State.

Notable people
Olanrewaju Fagbohun – Vice-Chancellor, Lagos State University

Education 
 O'Mark Schools

References

Populated places in Lagos State